Central Park Brass is a performing Quintet formed in 2002 to play an annual series of brass chamber music concerts in New York City’s Central Park.

The members are David Spier trumpet, Arthur Murray trumpet, Angela Cordell  French horn, Lisa Albrecht trombone, and Morris Kainuma tuba.  For the 2008 season Douglas Lyons substituted for Cordell and Michael Seltzer for Albrecht.

References

External links

Musical groups established in 2002
Brass quintets
Central Park
American brass bands
2002 establishments in New York City